Vserv is a platform for mobile marketing and commerce. The platform has a mobile internet user base in India and Southeast Asia with insights on users in these markets. Founded in 2010, Vserv has over 500 million user profiles and is backed by Maverick Capital, IDG Ventures India and Epiphany Ventures.

History
Vserv was founded in January 2010 by Dippak Khurana and Ashay Padwal.

Key offerings

Vserv Smart Data platform
In October 2014, Vserv launched its Vserv Smart Data platform for mobile marketing. This platform aggregates data from Vserv's data management platform which is augmented by combining data from multiple sources such as telcos, apps and offline partners. Vserv Smart Data builds user personas and triggers intent signals in real-time to help drive results for marketers, telcos and app publishers. Vserv has partnerships with telcos for accelerating its smart data offering to users in India and Southeast Asia.

Vserv Commerce solution
In May 2015, Vserv entered the commerce space. The company provides solutions for Telcos and DTH operators. With the integration of buy buttons within ads, Telcos can provide segmented offers to their customers. For DTH operators, this solution enables them to sell segmented channel packs to their customers.

Products

AppWrapper
AppWrapper allows developers and publishers to enable app development lifecycle services like ad monetization, analytics, bug tracking and in-app purchases.

Funding
In January 2010, Vserv received an initial investment of US$175,000 from Ajay Adiseshann, who also runs a mobile payment company called PayMate.

In July 2011, Vserv received a first round of funding of US$2.7 million by IDG Ventures India, in July 2011.

In September 2012, Vserv raised US$4 million from Epiphany Ventures and IDG Ventures India.

In March 2015, Vserv raised US$11 million from Maverick Capital Ventures.

In 2015, Vserv raised US$15 million from hedge fund Maverick Capital and venture capital firm IDG Ventures India, signalling a selective revival of investor interest in local ad tech firms.

Data, analytics, and decisioning company Experian has picked up a strategic stake in smart data mobile marketing platform Vserv Digital Services. While the deal size and amount were undisclosed, the company stated the investment was in line with its vision to boost financial inclusion, by ensuring a friction-free digital onboarding experience for its consumers.

References

External links
Chamcha NFT Custody
Mobile Marketing Network
SEONZA Advertising Agency

Mobile marketing
Indian companies established in 2010